Musette Morell (1898 – 29 September 1950) was an Australian playwright and children's writer. She wrote both for the stage and for radio.

Born Moyna Ann Martin in 1898, she began writing poetry and short stories for magazines including The New Triad, The Bulletin and The Australian Woman's Mirror during the late 1920s. 

With theatre director Duncan Macdougall, she produced plays at the Playbox Theatre in 1930 and 1931, having earlier written about his efforts to establish that community theatre in Sydney in 1927.  Her first play, The Wife Exchange, was performed at the Tom Thumb Theatre in February 1934, followed later that year by Take It or Leave It.

She wrote a number of plays which were produced for radio by the ABC. She was also skilled in adapting children's classics, such as Gulliver's Travels and The Water Babies as radio serials for a young audience. Her two books for children, The Antics of Algy and Bush Cobbers, were published from successful radio serials she had written for the ABC. Bush Cobbers was highly commended at the 1948 Children's Book Council of Australia Book of the Year Awards.

Morell died at her home in Hornsby, New South Wales on 29 September 1950. She was survived by her husband John, her mother, brother, and sister.

Selected works 

 The Wife Exchange, 1934
 Take It or Leave It, 1934
The Quick and the Dead, 1935
His Gentle Art of Making Enemies, 1937
 The Antics of Algy, 1946
 Three Radio Plays, 1948
 Bush Cobbers, 1948 
 Ten Puppet Plays, 1950

References

External links 

 Ten Puppet Plays on Project Gutenberg Australia

1898 births
1950 deaths
Australian women dramatists and playwrights
Australian children's writers